Sir Walter Beresford James Gordon Sparkes (22 April 1889 – 15 June 1974)  was a Member of the Queensland Legislative Assembly.

Early life
Sparkes was born at Dubbo, New South Wales in 1889 to James Sparkes and his wife Mary Ann (née Yates). He was educated at Croydon Park Public School and St Joseph's College, Hunters Hill before moving to Queensland in 1910.
By 1912 he had purchased Lyndley Hereford Stud at Jandowae, one of the oldest and best known Hereford studs in Australia. Sparkes expanded the stud from its original 3,000 acres to 16,000 acres by acquiring adjoining properties. Over the years he went on to acquire many properties across the southern part of the state.

Politics
Sparkes was elected as a councillor to the Wambo Shire Council in 1916 and eventually became its chairman between 1922–31 and 1937–52. He entered the state parliament in 1932, winning Dalby for the Country and Progressive National Party but did not seek re-election in 1935. Representing the Country Party in 1941, Sparkes won the seat of Aubigny, holding it for 19 years until his defeat in 1960 by Queensland Labor Party candidate, Les Diplock. During this period he was the Opposition whip from 1950 till 1957.

Personal life
Sparkes was married twice; first, Jessie Elizabeth Lang in 1912 and then Alice Goongarry Scott in 1920. He had six children with his two partners including Sir Robert Sparkes, president of the Queensland branch of the National Party from 1970 till 1990.

He was knighted in 1970.

Sparkes died at Toowoomba in 1974 and was cremated. The Queensland Premier at the time, Joh Bjelke-Petersen told the members of parliament that "Sparkes spoke almost daily in this Chamber on behalf of the working man and the man on the land. He always fought their case, and fought it hard".

References

Members of the Queensland Legislative Assembly
1889 births
1974 deaths
People from Dubbo
Australian Knights Bachelor
Australian politicians awarded knighthoods
20th-century Australian politicians